Bhokal is a superhero appearing in Raj Comics. Most stories are based on dark fantasy with blood and gore. Bhokal was created by Manoj Gupta and Sanjay Gupta.

Story Plot

He is a legendary winged warrior prince of a fictional fabled Parilok (fairyland). He descended to earth to take part in a fighting tournament and landed in Vikasnagar, becoming a zealous defender of the people of Vikasnagar.

Origin
Real name Rajkumar Alop (Prince Alop), Bhokal appeared first in a seven comic series along with his friends Tureen (with whom he falls in love), Shootan and Atikrur. He killed his rival Fuchang who was responsible for death of his parents. Presently Bhokal's parental origins are being explored in the latest issues starting from 'Dhikkar' where Bhokal loses his powers as a result of a conspiracy planned by his master and mentor Mahaguru Bhokal. In issues 'Dhikkar' and 'Antardwand' Bhokal battles to retain his powers as well as find and clear name of his biological father 'Yuddheshthveer'. His quest to find his father continues in 'Yugaandhar'. Mr. Nitin Mishra is writing the origin series for Bhokal, Dhikkar and Antardwand were its debut issues which were illustrated by Mr. Hemant Kumar. Yugaandhar is illustrated by Mr. Lalit Singh and Mr. Nitin Mishra, it is written by Mr. Nitin Mishra.

Bhokal also appeared in issues of Bankelal.

Powers and abilities
Bhokal can summon the 'Bhokal-Shakti', the power of his teacher, Mahaguru Bhokal, by hailing his name in battle, shouting 'Jai Mahaguru Bhokal'. He acquires super-human physical attributes, apart from receiving the mystical Sword and Shield of his master. The Sword is capable of cutting through most of the then-known materials and elements, making it one of the greatest weapons of its time. It can also be used to emit 'Jwala-Shakti', a mystical fire from its edge, which is known to burn away almost anything in a matter of seconds. The Shield is capable of blocking any physical or supernatural attack and also allows its wielder to fly via the Shield. He once wielded the weapon Prahara on his forehead, in memory of its previous owner and Bhokal's deceased wife, Turin. It granted him psychic powers.

Supporting characters

Friends and relations 
Turin: aka Rajkumari Sofia (princess Sofia). Turin is a princess from another planet.  First love interest of Bhokal and later became his wife. Turin was the owner of the magical weapon prahara and master of a magical cat "Kapala". Turin was killed by Himraj in the Himalayan valleys. Bhokal was out in the battlefields fighting for his adopted country and could not save her. Later in Saat Sawaal he goes in search of her soul and finally he gets back his beloved Turin in Laut Aayi Turin. Turin left Bhokal after Saloni and Rupsi became pregnant with Bhokal's child. Later on it was found that, Maya controlled Bhokal's mind to destroy his reputation and his relationship with Turin.
Kapala Turin's shape shifting cat which can fly. She took a human female form with cat's eye to save Turin's son after Turin was killed.
Rupsi: Niece of Vikasmohan and princess of neighbouring kingdom. Bhokal had another child with Rupsi under Maya's influence.
Saloni:(a skilled archer) Daughter of a sage. Although he never loved the other two as much as he loved Turin, bound by vow to protect them, he can never leave them. Under the mind control of Jadugarni Maya (enchantress Maya) Bhokal  had twins with Saloni.
Shootan was the sammohan-samrat ... who could hypnotise anyone and anything with his eyes. Shootan was killed by his enemies in Chitaghati. But after many years he came back in Ghar Aaya Shootan when Bhokal's uncle tried to take over his homeland and in the process resurrected Shootan as to kill Bhokal but eventually Shootan freed from his will and thus returned completely as older self. In "Sammohan Ghat" the royal warlock Tillu tried to impersonate Shootan as enemy of Vikasnagar but was eventually caught.
Mohini: Queen of Vikasnagar. She became the sole ruler after her husband Vikasmohan was killed by Jadugarni Maya.
Venu who started her career as a child-kidnapper but after falling in love with Shootan transformed herself for the better and then fought many a battle alongside her husband, Bhokal, Turin, etc., she carried a flute that could mesmerise anybody and get converted into a battle axe if summoned.
Ladaki Shootan's second wife. Skilled in armed combat.
Atikrur, the wielder of the dantak has the strength of 10 elephants and can flatten mountains with his blows. But later on his appearances with Bhokal dwindled after he went back to his planet.
Piku Pakodia wife of Atikrur
Tilli Once Bhokal and Turin was almost brutally stoned by the people of Vikasnagar. Tilli with his tantrik energy, revived both of them from near death.
Shweta Teen princess of Vikasnagar
Ankit Prince of Vikasnagar
Vikasmohan King of Vikasnagar
Rani Chanda Obsessive suitor of Bhokal.

Enemies
Incomputable enemies of Bhokal have appeared in Bhokal's comics; many died, but some lived on to appear again. Here is the list of Bhokal's major enemies :

 Fuchang : Appears in First seven Comics of Bhokal, Fuchang is the murderer of Bhokal's Family, Killed by Bhokal in comics "Bhokal Aur Fuchang"
 Himraj 
 Guneek 
 Kaal-Kundli
 Dharni-Dhar
 Maharavan
 Kaal
 Chaddam
 Kubda Shaitan
 Rani Maya
 Baba Yaga
 Shootan

New Bhokal : Pari Rakshak Bhokal

In order to publish something for the kids, Raj comics has started publishing a new series namely Pari Rakshak Bhokal. This Bhokal is entirely different from the original one but has the same powers. And story also takes place in the present Rc universe.

List of Bhokal Comics

Khaufnaak Khel
Tilsmi Olampaak
Bhokal
Shutaan
Atikroor
Bhokal Tilism Mein
Tilism Toot Gaya
Bhokal Aur Fuchang
Atikroor Aur Gajokh
Vikanda
Ssabse Bada Hatyara
Piku Pakodia
Tureen
Kapala
Zehar Ghati
Shutaan Ki Shaadi
Shaitan Buddhe
Teen Chudailen
Tantra
Chamatkari Bhokal
Mahaguru Bhokal
Shaktishaali
Bhokal Ki Talwar
MahaYoddha
Paatal Hatyara
Narak Jaal
Vajra
Kaali Kanthi
Jwala Shakti
Khatron ki Dharti
Shaitan Vriksh
Bhokal Ka Bhukamp
Bawandar
Main Hatyara Hoon
Parakrami
Kilaari Ka Rahasya
Cheeta Nagari
Tureen Ki Jung
Ye Shadyantra Hai
Mayajaal
Hatya Karunga Mein
Aatmhatya
Shaadi Nahi Hogi
Kachhua Mahal
Tilisma
Kubda Shaitaan
Kaun Banega Raja
Yudh Jeetunga Mein
Bhokal Nahi Harega
Bauna Bhokal
Bhokal Gayab
Jal Utha Registaan
Ret Ka Bhokal
Shaitan Beta
Vikat Vyuha
Yuddh Nahi Ladunga
Buddhi Pansa
Mar Gaya Shootan
Atyachaari
Aakhiri Nishani
Chudail Maa
Divyastra
Kaalkoot
Mrityujeet
Dankini
Kapalika
Kalanka
Mahayuddh
Maharavan
Dharni Dhar
Vishwa Rakshak
Laghu Ghati
Raktpaat
Akhetak
Guru Dakshina
Durgam
Mrityunjay
Lakshya
Gurutwa
Guneek
Fansi Do Bhokal Ko
Rann Chhodh
Chhadam
Bhokal Ka Kaal
Mrity Sanket
Mohra
Maat
Chaandal
Bhokal Bana Kankaal
Kaal Kundali
Mrityu Yog
Divya Charan
Ant
Tilismi Nidra
Jaal
Jaa Lalkaar Maut ko
Visharka
Ek aur Bheeshm
Bhokal Banega Raja
Bhanwar
Shaitaan Ki Maa
Kundla Ka Jaal
ShaktiHeen
Shikanja
Shaap
Maya Ka Jadoo
Diggaj
Bhootkaal
Prahara
Janjaal
Raajlakshmi
Trikhanda
Durbhiksh
Kaal Jantri
Bhokal Mera Gulam
Bhokal Jeet
Sabse Bada Mahabali
Jigar Ka Tukda
Chhal
Trikaal
Bhokal Shishya
Bhag Ja Bhokal
Shani Ka Putra
Mrit Sanjivani
Mrityu Aayi
Jo Jeeta So Haara
Markesh
Bhagya Vidhata
Trishaap
Saat Sawal
Laut aayi Tureen
Main Vachan Deta Hoon
Kaal Yatra
Kaaal Vashibhoot
Putla Tantra
Pataal Vijeta
Mitraghaat
Nasht
Kaal Olampaak
Vardaan
Bhago Bhokal aaya
Kaal Raat
Prithvi Chhodh Bhokal
Lutera Bhokal
Singhasan Mera
Asthi Shastra
Khoon karega Khoon
Sapno Ki Chabi
Kachhua Kawach
Mrityu Beej
Raaj Karega Shaitan
Ghar aaya Shootan
Shaitaan Chakra
Amrit Nahi Milega
Bhagya Lekhni
Ladna Seekho
Bisaat
Sammohan Ghat
Guru Bhokal
Kobi Dakshina
Pratham Bhokal
Pari Janm
Dev Yuddh
Bhokal Janm
Mahaguru Bhokal
Dhikkar
Antardwand
Yugandhar
Sarvanayak
Sarvadaman
Sarvasangram
Sarvasanhaar
Sarvamanthan
Sarvasandhi
Sarvakranti
Sarvashakti

Pari Rakshak Bhokal : Comics List

Kaal
Kaal Dansh
Kaal ka Jaal
Ant Kaal
Pari Rakshak Bhokal
Saat Ajube
Baba Yaga
Cindrella
Nightingale

References

External links
 Raj Comics
 Comics Vine

Fictional Indian people
Indian comics
Raj Comics superheroes
Indian superheroes
Fictional fairies and sprites
Indian mythology in popular culture